This is a list of candidates who stood for the 1920 state election in Queensland, Australia.The election was held on 9 October 1920.

Since the previous election in 1918, the Country Party had formed, and had been joined by many sitting National Party MPs. Four parties – the National, Country, Northern Country and National Labor parties – operated as a coalition in this election.

By-elections
 On 20 December 1919, Frank Bulcock (Labor) was elected to succeed T. J. Ryan (Labor), who had resigned on 14 October 1919, as the member for Barcoo.
 On 20 December 1919, Tom Foley (Labor) was elected to succeed Herbert Hardacre (Labor), who had resigned on 14 October 1919, as the member for Leichhardt.
 On 20 December 1919, Thomas Spencer (National) was elected to succeed John McEwan Hunter (Labor), who had died on 22 October 1919, as the member for Maranoa.
 On 10 April 1920, Percy Pease (Labor) was elected to succeed William Lennon (Labor), who had resigned on 16 January 1920, as the member for Herbert.

Retiring members
Note: Mundingburra Labor MLA Thomas Foley had died prior to the election; no by-election was held.

Labor
Edgar Free MLA (South Brisbane)

Nationalist
Donald Gunn MLA (Carnarvon)
Edward Macartney MLA (Toowong)
Henry Somerset MLA (Stanley)

Independent
Francis Grayson MLA (Cunningham)

Candidates
Sitting members at the time of the election are shown in bold text.

See also
 1923 Queensland state election
 Members of the Queensland Legislative Assembly, 1918–1920
 Members of the Queensland Legislative Assembly, 1920–1923
 List of political parties in Australia

References
 

Candidates for Queensland state elections